The 2000–01 Ligue 1 season (then called Division 1) was the 63rd since its establishment. FC Nantes won the French Association Football League  for the eighth time with 68 points.

Participating teams

 Auxerre
 Bastia
 Bordeaux
 Guingamp
 Lens
 Lille
 Lyon
 Marseille
 Metz
 Monaco
 Nantes
 Paris Saint-Germain
 Rennes
 Saint-Étienne
 Sedan
 Strasbourg
 Toulouse
 Troyes

League table

Promoted from Ligue 2, who will play in the 2001–02 Division 1
 Sochaux: champions of Ligue 2
 Lorient: runners-up
 Montpellier: third place

Results

Top goalscorers

References

External links
France 2000/01 at Rec.Sport.Soccer Statistics Foundation

Ligue 1 seasons
France
1